Westling is a surname. Notable people with the surname include: 

Dominica Westling (born 1984), Swedish actress and model
Daniel Westling (1973), Prince of Sweden, Duke of Västergötland, husband of Crown Princess Victoria of Sweden
Georg Westling (1879–1930), Finnish sailor 
Jon Westling (1942–2021), American educator
Lester L. Westling Jr. (1930-2019), American Episcopal priest, U.S. Navy chaplain, and author
Mikael Westling (born 1964), Swedish ice hockey player
Nathan Westling (born 1996), American fashion model
Roger Westling (born 1961), Swedish biathlete